Evan P. Shanley (born October 17, 1986) is an American attorney and politician serving as a member of the Rhode Island House of Representatives from the 24th district. Elected in November 2016, he assumed office in January 2017.

Early life and education 
Shanley was raised in Warwick, Rhode Island. After graduating from Toll Gate High School, he earned a Bachelor of Arts degree in history from Providence College in 2009 and a Juris Doctor from the Catholic University in 2012.

Career 
In 2012, Shanley began his career as an attorney at Blake & Uhlig in Kansas City, Missouri. Since 2013, he has been an attorney at Gursky|Wiens. He was elected to the Rhode Island House of Representatives in November 2016 and assumed office in January 2017. Shanley also served as vice chair of the House Judiciary Committee and chair of the House State Government and Elections Committee. In 2018, Shanley was chair of the Rhode Island Online Data Transparency and Privacy Protection Commission.

References 

1986 births
Living people
People from Warwick, Rhode Island
Politicians from Warwick, Rhode Island
People from Kent County, Rhode Island
Democratic Party members of the Rhode Island House of Representatives
Rhode Island lawyers
Providence College alumni
Catholic University of America alumni
Columbia Law School alumni